Richard Coffin (1684–1766) of Portledge, near Bideford, Devon was a British Whig politician who sat in the House of Commons between 1715 and 1734.

Coffin was baptized on. 23 July 1684, the fourth but only surviving son of Richard Coffin of Portledge and his third wife Anne Prideaux, daughter of Edmund Prideaux of Padstow, Cornwall. He succeeded his elder brother to the Portledge estate in 1703.

Coffin was returned as   a Whig Member of Parliament for Camelford at the  1715 British general election. He voted against the septennial bill, for the repeal of the Occasional Conformity and Schism Acts, and against the Peerage Bill. At the 1722 British general election  he stood unsuccessfully at Barnstaple, but   he was returned for it unopposed at the 1727 British general election  on the interest of his friend John Rolle. He continued to vote against the Administration. He did not stand again in 1734.

Coffin died unmarried late in 1766 and was buried on 3 December 1766. Ne left Portledge to Richard and Robert Bennett, sons of his sister Honour.

References

1684 births
1766 deaths
Members of the Parliament of Great Britain for Barnstaple
British MPs 1715–1722
British MPs 1727–1734
British MPs 1754–1761